Caçador is a municipality in the state of Santa Catarina in the South region of Brazil.

History

The banks of the Rio do Peixe (Fish River) were inhabited by ethnic native groups of Kaingangs and Xoklengs until 1881, when families of European origin settled here and, because of the abundance of hunting, dubbed the place "Rio do Caçador" (Hunter River).

Francisco Correa de Mello, who came from Campos Novos and settled on the banks of Rio do Peixe, in 1881, is considered the first resident of Portuguese origin; he was followed in 1887 by Pedro Ribeiro, and in 1891, Tomaz Gonçalves Padilha, who settled on November 15.

With the construction of the railroad São Paulo to Rio Grande do Sul from 1908 to 1910, the colonization intensified with an influx of Italian, German, Polish and Syrian-Lebanese immigrants . In 1910 the tracks reached Rio Caçador and attracted large numbers of immigrants of Italian origin, mainly from Rio Grande do Sul.  With the settlement of the core of Rio das Antas, many Teutonic-Brazilian settlers from the coast of Santa Catarina were established in the municipality by the Brazilian Railway Company.

The town of Caçador is in the heart of the region where, from 1912 to 1916, there was the so-called Contestado War.

In 1918 the first post office was built where there was already a state revenues post. The construction of the Road from Caçador to Curitibanos in 1933 spurred the development of the region. Rio Caçador, which was founded in 1923, came under the auspices of the municipal district of Campos Novos. In the administrative division report for the year of 1933, Rio Caçador district was included in the municipality of Curitibanos.

Population growth and the lumber industry led to the creation of the municipality, established on March 25, 1934 and dis-enchartered the cities of Curitibanos, Campos Novos, Cruzeiro and Porto União.

Caçador's economy has been developed through the harvesting and processing of timber and reforestation. Agriculture emerged as a new option for generating foreign exchange, especially for fresh produce where Caçador is considered the largest producer of tomatoes in southern Brazil.

The name "Caçador" is derived from "Caçadores", a variety of Portuguese infantry created during the 17th century. "Caçadores" means "hunters" in Portuguese.

Climate

The city has a temperate oceanic climate (Köppen climate classification Cfb), with an average annual temperature of 16.0 °C (60.8 degree Fahrenheit), it has hot and humid summers with cold and dry winters. It is known for its below freezing temperatures during winter.

Caçador holds the record minimum temperature of Brazil; -14.0 °C (6.8 degree Fahrenheit) on June 11, 1952. Another record, which is unofficial, of -17.8 °C (-0.04 degree Fahrenheit) in 1996 in Morro da Igreja, Urubici, also in Santa Catarina, would be the record minimum for Brazil.

During the months of May to September, frosts and occasional snowfalls may occur.

See also
List of municipalities in Santa Catarina

References

Municipalities in Santa Catarina (state)